The Saudi Arabia men's national 3x3 team is a national basketball team of Saudi Arabia, administered by the Saudi Arabian Basketball Federation.
It represents the country in international 3x3 (3 against 3) basketball competitions.

See also
Saudi Arabia men's national basketball team

References

Basketball in Saudi Arabia
Basketball teams in Saudi Arabia
Men's national 3x3 basketball teams
3